Dead Realm was a horror-style game for the PC. The main gameplay consists of one player taking control of a ghost while the remaining players are humans who must avoid being haunted by the ghost. On August 27, 2020, 3BLACKDOT ended support and closed the official servers according to an announcement made on August 19, 2020, due to overwhelmingly negative reviews.

Gameplay
Dead Realm starts off with several players, the maximum being 8 players in a game. The game consist of two game modes, Seek & Reap and Bounty. Seek & Reap is the basic game mode of the game. The game mode pits two teams, Humans, and Ghosts. The Humans must run or hide from the Ghost, and the Ghost attempts to find the Humans, turning them into Ghosts, who then jump scare the remaining players.

Development
The game's creative directors include TheSyndicateProject, and SeaNanners, with the help of VanossGaming.

Dead Realm was made available through the Steam Early Access platform, and was fully released on May 23, 2017.

Reception
An early version of the game was previewed by Rock Paper Shotgun. 

While the game received positive reviews on Steam at first, most likely aided by VanossGaming's videos of him playing the game to promote it, they did not last long. By 2018 the reviews became extremely negative, including one that said "Dead Realm is quite literally a dead realm. The developers are charging £11 for an abandoned, broken, buggy mess that they have no intention of fixing." Other reviews said things such as "the game is just that - dead." and that it was "impossible" to play a game unless one was able to invite friends, "because no plays the game anymore." These scathing reviews - compounded with other issues such as lag - eventually led to the servers being shut down in 2020. However, the game did not officially close down until August of the same year. Despite this, it ended with "Mixed" reviews on Steam.

Controversy
After the three YouTubers involved in production of Dead Realm (Adam Montoya, Tom Cassell, and Evan Fong) published their Let's Play videos about the game, they encountered controversy due to the fact that they did not clearly disclose their financial ties to the game, which constituted a violation of the FTC's ".com Disclosures" set of guidelines.

References

External links
 Official website

2015 video games
Horror video games
Multiplayer video games
Windows games
MacOS games
Video games developed in the United States